Víctor Andrey Bolívar Ordóñez (born September 30, 1983) is a Costa Rican professional footballer who currently plays as a goalkeeper for Liga Nacional club Sololá.

Club career
Bolívar played for several clubs in Cosra Rica, most notably Municipal Liberia and Saprissa. He announced his retirement when with Santos de Guápiles, whom he joined in January 2013, in May 2013 but returned to the game when he joined Puntarenas on loan from Santos in August 2013.

In May 2014, Bolívar was snapped up by Herediano, only to leave them for Universidad in December 2014.

In December 2019, Bolívar joined Quiché FC in Guatemala.

International career
He earned his first international cap in a 2-1 victory against El Salvador on October 12, 2010, following a strong season with his club, Club Deportivo Barrio Mexico.

Personal life
Bolívar is married to model Alejandra Rodríguez and they have a son, Iker Andrey.

References

External links
 
 

1983 births
Living people
Association football goalkeepers
Costa Rican footballers
Costa Rican expatriate footballers
Costa Rican people of Spanish descent
Costa Rica international footballers
Municipal Liberia footballers
Brujas FC players
Deportivo Saprissa players
Santos de Guápiles footballers
A.D. Carmelita footballers
Puntarenas F.C. players
Antigua GFC players
C.S. Herediano footballers
C.F. Universidad de Costa Rica footballers
Deportivo Petapa players
Deportivo Sanarate F.C. players
C.D. Malacateco players
Municipal Grecia players
Liga FPD players
Liga Nacional de Fútbol de Guatemala players
Costa Rican expatriate sportspeople in Guatemala
Expatriate footballers in Guatemala